Carlos Antonio Meléndez Flores (born 12 November 1958 in San Salvador, El Salvador) is a retired Salvadoran football (soccer) player.

Club career
Nicknamed El Cacho, Meléndez, won the Salvadoran league title with Atlético Marte in 1985. In 1980, he played in Costa Rica for Asociación Deportiva San Miguel.

Retirement
After he retired, he became a manager, and coached Independiente Nacional 1906, Nejapa F.C. and Alacranes Del Norte.

Honours
Primera División de Fútbol de El Salvador: 1
 1985

References

External links
 Alacranes del Norte Roster Clausura 2010 - Esalmundo

1958 births
Living people
Sportspeople from San Salvador
Association football goalkeepers
Salvadoran footballers
C.D. Atlético Marte footballers
C.D. Luis Ángel Firpo footballers
Alianza F.C. footballers
Salvadoran expatriate footballers
Expatriate footballers in Costa Rica
Salvadoran expatriate sportspeople in Costa Rica
Salvadoran football managers